All for a Girl is a 1915 American comedy drama short silent black and white film directed by Roy Applegate and starring Renee Kelly. It is based on the 1908 play by Rupert Hughes.

Cast
 Renee Kelly as Antoinette Hoadley
 Edward G. Longman as Harold Jepson
 Frank DeVernon as Mr. Dinwiddie
 Sue Balfour as Mrs. Van Espen
 E.T. Roseman as Briggs
 Roy Applegate as Arthur Jepson / Old farmer
 Margaret Willard as Miss Dinwiddie
 Georgia Harvey as Miss Broderick
 Al Grady as Basil Mugg
 Jerold Hevener as Count Barony
 Sidney D'Albrook as Prince De Cauchy
 Bert Tuey as Clerk
 Robert Lawrence

References

External links
 

1915 comedy-drama films
American silent short films
1915 short films
American black-and-white films
Films with screenplays by Lillian Case Russell
Films based on works by Rupert Hughes
1915 films
1910s American films
Silent American comedy-drama films
Comedy-drama short films